Daniel Peter Webber (born 28 June 1988) is an Australian actor. Among his best known roles, Webber has portrayed Mötley Crüe lead singer Vince Neil in the 2019 film The Dirt, Lee Harvey Oswald in the American science fiction thriller miniseries 11.22.63 and Lewis Wilson in the Netflix original series The Punisher.

Early life and education
Webber grew up on the New South Wales Central Coast and attended Green Point Christian College. He was a trampolinist and performed in the 2000 Summer Olympics closing ceremony.

Career
Webber worked as a rope access technician on wind turbines. His first acting experience was on the 2009 film The Combination. From 2009–2010, he portrayed Darius Pike on the TV series K-9. He also had roles on All Saints and in the miniseries Devil's Dust.

In 2015, Webber played Ryan Kelly, a stalker, on Australian soap opera Home and Away.

Webber's role on the J. J. Abrams-produced 11.22.63 was his first in the United States. He got the role after sending in an audition tape, which he had two days to prepare for, including watching newsreels of Oswald and listening to clips of his voice. After he was cast, he then read the novel on which it was based, as well as other books about the assassination. Webber received praise for "mastering Oswald's peculiar speech pattern and growing sense of paranoia."

In 2016, he starred alongside Lena Headey and fellow Australian Eliza Taylor in the police drama film Thumper.

Webber played a distraught United States Army veteran who suffers from PTSD in the Netflix television series The Punisher.

In 2019, Webber portrayed Mötley Crüe lead singer Vince Neil in the 2019 Netflix film The Dirt. He also appeared in the feature film Danger Close, directed by Kriv Stenders.

Filmography

Film

Television

References

External links
 

1988 births
Living people
Australian male television actors
People from Gosford
21st-century Australian male actors
Australian male film actors
Australian trampolinists